Arthur Fagan (born 24 April 1931) is an Australian former cricketer. He played four first-class matches for New South Wales between 1953/54 and 1956/57.

See also
 List of New South Wales representative cricketers

References

External links
 

1931 births
Living people
Australian cricketers
New South Wales cricketers
Cricketers from New South Wales